María Carmen Collado (born 29 July 1983) is a Spanish former swimmer who competed in the 2000 Summer Olympics.

References

1983 births
Living people
Spanish female breaststroke swimmers
Olympic swimmers of Spain
Swimmers at the 2000 Summer Olympics
Place of birth missing (living people)
21st-century Spanish women